Tijuca Tênis Clube, abbreviated as Tijuca T.C., is a Brazilian professional basketball club that is based in the Tijuca neighborhood, in the Northern Zone of the city of Rio de Janeiro, Brazil.

History
Tijuca's parent athletic association was founded in 1915, initially as a tennis club, with the name Tijuca Lawn Tennis Club. Basketball was introduced later, and became the club's most popular sport. Tijuca has reached the final of the Rio de Janeiro State Championship ten times, losing them all. In 2010, 2011, and 2012, Tijuca lost to Flamengo in the Rio de Janeiro State Finals.

In 2011, the team won the Brazilian Super Cup against Liga Sorocabana, and acquired the right to play in Brazil's top-tier level league, the NBB, in the 2011–12 season. In that season, Tijuca finished the regular season in twelfth place in the league. In the playoffs, the team was beaten by Uberlândia.

Roster

Honors and titles

National
Brazilian Super Cup 
Winners (1): 2011
Brazilian 2nd Division
 Champions (1): 1997

Regional
 Rio de Janeiro State Championship
Runners-up (10): 1945, 1960, 1961, 1993, 1994, 1995, 1996, 2010, 2011, 2012

Other sports
Besides the club's basketball team, Tijuca T.C. also has other sports sections for futsal, swimming, and several other sports.

References

External links
Official website 
Latinbasket.com Team Profile

Basketball teams in Brazil